The Dubuque Fighting Saints were a Tier I junior ice hockey team that played in the United States Hockey League (USHL) from 1980 to 2001. The team moved to Tulsa, Oklahoma to become the Tulsa Crude in 2001 citing low attendance and rising costs. A new team would use the same name when Dubuque was granted an expansion franchise in the USHL in 2010.

The Saints glory years lasted from 1980–81 through to 1984–85, when they played under the coaching supervision of Jack Barzee who left to become a central figure in the National Hockey League's Central Scouting Staff, and later, received the Lester Patrick Trophy  from USA Hockey and the NHL for his exceptional contribution to the development of hockey in the United States.  During their first season in 1980–81, the Fighting Saints record was 52–11–2, a league record. In 1982–83, the Saints went on to win their second national championship in three years.

History
Prior to 1979, the USHL was a semi-professional hockey league operating in midwestern United States. The Waterloo Black Hawks made the transition to a junior hockey team in 1979 as the league switched to junior hockey as the associated costs with paying professionals were rising. After one season, head coach and general manager, Jack Barzee, had the Black Hawks relocated to Dubuque, Iowa, and renamed the team the Fighting Saints. The team would prove to be very successful under Barzee and would win two national championships, three playoff championships, and two regular season titles before Barzee left in 1985.

After Barzee's departure, the team began to struggle on and off the ice. The team's record decreased every season until it finally finished last in 1988–89 and 1989–90 seasons. It was not until Chris and Peter Ferraro joined the team in 1990–91 did the team start to play competitively again. Coach Cary Eades took over in 1991–92 and brought the team back to contention including a National Tournament championship in 1992–93 before he left in 1993. Owner Brian Gallagher would eventually take over as head coach in the 1997–98 season and the team would only make the playoffs once in his tenure. In 2001, Gallagher announced he was moving the team to Tulsa, Oklahoma, citing rising costs and low attendance. He renamed the team the Tulsa Crude but only lasted one season before ceasing operations.

Seasons records 

(*) = Depending on the year, league rules changed often in regards to use of Ties (T), Overtime Losses (OTL), and Shootout Losses (SOL). Not all categories were used each year.

-- = Penalty Minutes (PIM) were not a recorded league stat until the 1996-97 season.

Championships 
Clark Cup: Awarded each year to the winner of the USHL's Tier I Junior Hockey playoff champions. Dubuque won this Cup three of its first five years as a franchise.
1980–81
1982–83
1984–85

Anderson Cup: Won by the team that accumulates the most points in the standings at the end of the regular season. Dubuque won the Anderson Cup in two of the franchise's first three seasons.
1980–81
1982–83

Alumni

National Hockey League
Chris Ferraro (1990–91, 1991–92)
 Played for the New York Rangers, Pittsburgh Penguins, Edmonton Oilers, New York Islanders, and Washington Capitals
 4th round NHL draft choice by the New York Rangers
Represented the United States at the World Junior Hockey Championships in 1992 and 1993, and at the World Championships in 2003
Peter Ferraro (1990–91, 1991–92)
 Played for the New York Rangers, Pittsburgh Penguins, Boston Bruins, and Washington Capitals
 1st round NHL draft choice by the New York Rangers
Mark Mowers (1993–94)
 Played for the Nashville Predators, Detroit Red Wings, Boston Bruins, and Anaheim Ducks
 Undrafted from the University of New Hampshire
Gary Suter (1981–82, 1982–83)
 NHL Rookie of the Year, 1985–86
 Played for the Calgary Flames, Chicago Blackhawks, and the San Jose Sharks
 9th round NHL draft choice (out of 12 rounds) by the Calgary Flames
 Two time Olympian for the United States including the Silver Medal in 2002.
 Inducted into the U.S. Hockey Hall of Fame in 2011
Landon Wilson (1992–93)
 Played for the Colorado Avalanche, Boston Bruins, Phoenix Coyotes, Pittsburgh Penguins, and Dallas Stars
 1st round NHL draft choice by the Toronto Maple Leafs
Andy Wozniewski (1998–99)
 Played for Toronto Maple Leafs, St. Louis Blues, and Boston Bruins
 Undrafted from the University of Wisconsin - Madison

European leagues 
 Jimmy Andersson - Bofors IK (Sweden)
 Mike Fallon - 1980–81, 1982–83 Saints - Bofors IK (Sweden)
 Chris Guy - 1980–81 Saints - Nijmegen Tigers (Holland)
 Steven Janakas - 1980–81 Saints - Saterbagen Saints (Sweden)
 Jozef Lukac, - 1999–2000 Saints - BK Mladá Boleslav (Czech Republic)
 Micah Wouters - Nijmegen Tigers (Holland)

American Hockey League
Akil Adams - Carolina Monarchs
Michael Ayers - Manitoba Moose
Sean Berens - Springfield Falcons
Peter Cermak - Hershey Bears
Kord Cernich - Capital District Islanders
Matt Doman - Saint John Flames
Luk Fulghum - Toronto Marlies
Jason Guerriero - Milwaukee Admirals
Jim Mullin - Worcester IceCats
Nick Naumenko - Grand Rapids Griffins
Greg Poss - Maine Mariners
Ken Scuderi - Portland Pirates
Jeff State - Hershey Bears
David Vallieres - Kentucky Thoroughblades
Kory Wright - 1982–83 Saints -Moncton Hawks

ECHL
Nick Anderson - Las Vegas Wranglers
Todd Barclay - Pensacola Ice Pilots
Josh Blackburn - Columbia Inferno
Todd Cary - Richmond Renegades
Chris Cerrella - Baton Rouge Kingfish
Bernie Chimel - Wheeling Nailers
Trent Clark - San Diego Gulls
Jon Foster - Wheeling Nailers
Jon Gaskins - Mississippi Sea Wolves
Forrest Gore - Peoria Rivermen
Zach Ham - South Carolina Stingrays
Matt Herhal - Reading Royals
Kurt Kabat - Hampton Roads Admirals
Josh Kern - Peoria Rivermen
Jack Kowal - Miami Matadors
Jeff Kozakowski - Toledo Storm
Phil Lewandowski - Long Beach Ice Dogs
Kevin Magnuson - Roanoke Express
Chris Masters - Trenton Titans
Peter Masters - Dayton Bombers
Matt McElwee - Toledo Storm
Jeff Mikesch - Louisville RiverFrogs
Sean Molina - Cincinnati Cyclones
Pete Pierman - New Orleans Brass
Andy Powers - South Carolina Stingrays
Jasen Rintala - Greensboro Generals
Tom Rouleau - Wheeling Nailers
John Sadowski - Mobile Mysticks
Seabrook Satterlund - Toledo Storm
Trent Schachle - Dayton Bombers
Joe Smaza - Wheeling Nailers
Chris Thompson - Dayton Bombers
Mitch Vig - Mobile Mysticks

International Hockey League
Geoff Collard - Orlando Solar Bears
Bryan Collins - 1980–81 Saints - Fort Wayne Komets
Tim Breslin - Chicago Wolves
Steve MacSwain - 1982–83 Saints - Salt Lake Golden Eagles
Curt Voegeli - 1980–81 Saints - Peoria Prancers

Other leagues
Jayme Adduono - Columbus Cottonmouths (Central Hockey League (CHL))
Grady Ambrose - Lakeland Ice Warriors (Sunshine Hockey League)
Anthony Blumer - Elmira Jackals (United Hockey League (UHL))
Brandon Carlson - Anchorage Aces (West Coast Hockey League (WCHL))
Jaroslav Cesky - Tulsa Oilers (CHL)
Brendon Clark - Roanoke Valley Vipers (UHL)
Christian Fletcher - San Angelo Saints (CHL)
Maurice Hall - Memphis RiverKings (CHL)
Rich Hansen - Amarillo Gorillas (CHL)
Wynn Henricksen - Odessa Jackalopes (Western Professional Hockey League (WPHL))
Brian Hill - Madison Monsters (UHL)
Anders Johnson - Knoxville Speed (UHL)
Adam Kragthorpe - Quad City Mallards (UHL)
Brian LaVack - B.C. Icemen (UHL)
John Lex - 1980–81 Saints - Erie Golden Blades (Atlantic Coast Hockey League)
Skeeter Moore - 1981–1982 Saints - San Angelo Outlaws (CHL)
Darren Semeniuk - Anchorage Aces (WCHL)
Joe Statkus - Rockford IceHogs (UHL)
Alex Todd - Lubbock Cotton Kings (CHL)
Eric Tuott - Phoenix Mustangs (WCHL)
Paul Williams - Anchorage Aces (WCHL)

References

External links 
 Current Dubuque Fighting Saints Team History

United States Hockey League teams
Ice hockey teams in Iowa
Dubuque, Iowa
Ice hockey clubs established in 1980
Ice hockey clubs disestablished in 2001
1980 establishments in Iowa
2001 disestablishments in Iowa
Defunct ice hockey teams in the United States